The 1995 Supercoppa Italiana was a match contested by Juventus, the 1994–95 Serie A winner, Parma, the 1994–95 Coppa Italia runner-up, since Juventus had won both trophies in the 1994–95 season. 
It was the second appearance for both teams, after Juventus was defeated by Napoli in 1990 and Parma lost against Milan in 1992.

The match was played in January 1996 because of scheduling conflicts.

Match details

References

1995
Supercoppa 1995
Supercoppa 1995
Supercoppa Italiana